The Beekmantown Group is a late Cambrian to lower–middle Ordovician geologic group that occurs in the eastern Canada (Québec) and northeastern United States, datable from its conodont fauna.  It contains dolomitic sandstones and carbonates from just off land from the palaeocoastline.

The usage of the term is diverse and depends on the state or region in question, and the group encompasses different formations in different regions.  In some states it is considered a formation rather than a group, but the lithology varies by region.

See also

 List of fossiliferous stratigraphic units in New Jersey
 Paleontology in New Jersey

References

Geologic groups of New Jersey